Green-striped darner may refer to:

 Aeshna verticalis, a species of dragonfly native to North America
 Dromaeschna forcipata, a species of dragonfly, native to northern Australia

Animal common name disambiguation pages